Proto-Iroquoian is the theoretical proto-language of the Iroquoian languages. Lounsbury (1961) estimated from glottochronology a time depth of 3,500 to 3,800 years for the split of North and South Iroquoian. 

At the time of early European contact, French explorers in the 16th century encountered villages along the St. Lawrence River, now associated with the St. Lawrence Iroquoian. Other better known northern tribes took over their territory and displaced them, and were later encountered by more French, European and English colonists. These tribes included the Huron and Neutral in modern-day Ontario, first encountered by French explorers and traders; the Five Nations of the Iroquois League in Upstate New York and Pennsylvania, and the Erie Nation and Susquehannock peoples in Pennsylvania. 

Southern speakers of Iroquoian languages ranged from the Cherokee in the Great Smoky Mountains, to the Tuscarora and Nottoway in the interior near the modern Virginia/North Carolina border.

Subdivisions
The Iroquoian languages are usually divided into two main groups: Southern Iroquoian (Cherokee) and Northern Iroquoian (all others) based on the great differences in vocabulary and modern phonology. Northern Iroquoian is further divided by Lounsbury and Mithun into Proto-Tuscarora-Nottoway and Lake Iroquoian. Julian (2010) does not believe Lake Iroquoian to be a valid subgrouping.

History of studies
Isolated studies were done by Chafe (1977a), Michelson (1988), and Rudes (1995). There have also been several works of internal reconstruction for daughter languages, in particular Seneca and Mohawk. A preliminary full reconstruction of Proto-Iroquoian was not provided until Charles Julian's (2010) work.

Phonology
Proto-Iroquoian as reconstructed shares the Iroquoian languages' notable typological traits of small consonant inventories, complex consonant clusters, and a lack of labial consonants.

Vowels
The reconstructed vowel inventory for Proto-Iroquoian is:

Like later Iroquoian languages, Proto-Iroquoian is distinguished in having nasal vowels /õ/ and /ẽ/, although it has more than in its daughter languages.

Consonants
The reconstructed consonant inventory for Proto-Iroquoian is given in the table below. The consonants of all Iroquoian languages pattern so that they may be grouped as (oral) obstruents, sibilants, laryngeals, and resonants (Lounsbury 1978:337).

Morphology
Reconstructed functional morphemes from Julian (2010):

Lexicon
Reconstructed lexical roots and particles from Julian (2010):

References

 
 Barbeau, Marius. (1960). Huron-Wyandot Traditional Narratives in Translations and Native Texts. Ottawa: National Museum of Canada, Bulletin 165, Anthropological Series No. 47.
Chafe, Wallace. (1977a). "Accent and Related Phenomena in the Five Nations Iroquois Languages". In Larry Hyman, ed. Studies in Stress and Accent, 169-181. Southern California Occasional Papers in Linguistics 4.
Michelson, Karin. (1988). A Comparative Study of Lake-Iroquoian Accent. Dordrecht: Kluwer Academic Publishers.
Rudes, Blair. (1995). "Iroquoian Vowels". Anthropological Linguistics 37: 16-69.
Lounsbury, Floyd. (1961). Iroquois-Cherokee Linguistic Relations. In William Fenton and John Gulick, eds. Symposium on Cherokee and Iroquois Culture. Bureau of American Ethnology Bulletin 180, 11-17.
 Lounsbury, Floyd G. (1978). "Iroquoian Languages". in Bruce G. Trigger (ed.). Handbook of North American Indians, Vol. 15: Northeast. Washington, DC: Smithsonian Institution. pp. 334–343. .
Mooney, James. (1900). Myths of the Cherokee. 19th Annual Report of the Bureau of American Ethnology, Part 1, 3-548. Washington, D.C.: Government Printing Office.

Iroquoian
Iroquoian languages